Alex Avery Garza (born February 13, 1994) is a Democratic member of the Michigan House of Representatives.

Garza had political experience before his current term as State Representative. Garza was elected Taylor City Council member, and served on the council from in 2013 and 2018 and served as Legislative Aide to Stephanie Chang and Rashida Tlaib. His election in 2013 marked the first time in history a person of color held local office in Taylor, Michigan. Garza served as Mayor Pro-Tem of the Taylor City Council from 2017 until his inauguration as State Representative in 2019. Garza was the youngest Latino ever elected to the state house.

In 2021, Garza announced his intention to run for mayor of Taylor.

References

External links 
 Alex Garza at housedems.com
 Alex Garza at ballotpedia.org

Living people
Hispanic and Latino American city council members
Hispanic and Latino American state legislators
People from Taylor, Michigan
University of Michigan–Dearborn alumni
Democratic Party members of the Michigan House of Representatives
Michigan city council members
21st-century American politicians
1994 births